Prodigal Son is the first single by American rock band Sevendust from their seventh studio album Chapter VII: Hope and Sorrow and was written by vocalist Lajon Witherspoon and drummer Morgan Rose. The song premiered on Active and Mainstream Rock radio on February 10, 2008.

Music video
The song music video was directed by Jason Sciavicco and Tim Walbert for Horizon Entertainment and was edited by Bob Rose and made one month after the song was released. In the video the band performs at a church in front of clergyman and it was the first music video that Clint Lowery appeared on this.

Chart position
The song reached #19 in Mainstream Rock Charts Billboard 200.

Singles 
Billboard (North America)

References

2008 singles
Sevendust songs
Songs written by John Connolly (musician)
Songs written by Morgan Rose
Songs written by Lajon Witherspoon
Songs written by Vinnie Hornsby
Asylum Records singles
2007 songs